Rupert (German: Ruprecht) (1506 – 28 July 1544) was the Count of Veldenz from 1543 until 1544.

Life
Rupert was born in Zweibrücken in 1506 as the youngest son of Alexander, Count Palatine of Zweibrücken. As a younger son, Rupert was designated by his father into a church career, while his older brother Louis became the next Count Palatine of Zweibrücken. In 1517 he became a member of the Cathedral of Strasbourg, a position he held until early 1533, after his brother Louis had died in December 1532. Rupert then served as regent and guardian for Louis' young son Wolfgang, the new Count Palatine of Zweibrücken.

When Wolfgang reached majority in 1543, one of his first actions was to enact the Marburger Contract, granting his uncle Rupert the County of Veldenz. Rupert died the following year and was succeeded as Count of Veldenz by his son, George John.

Marriage and issue
Rupert married Ursula of Salm-Kyrburg (c. 1515 – 24 July 1601), daughter of Wild- and Rhinegrave John VII, on 23 June 1537 and had the following children:
Anne (12 May 1540 – 28 July 1586)
George John (11 April 1543 – 18 April 1592)
Ursula (born 3 October 1543, date of death unknown)

Counts Palatine of the Holy Roman Empire
House of Wittelsbach
1506 births
1544 deaths